The Treaty of Limits was a 1906 treaty between Brazil and the Netherlands which established the international boundary between Brazil and the Dutch colony of Suriname. The treaty defined the border as being

formed from the French border French Guiana to the British border British Guiana, the line of the watershed between the Amazon basin to the south, and the basins of the rivers flowing into north to the Atlantic Ocean.

The treaty also established the possibility of designating a joint Brazilian–Dutch commission that would physically demarcate the border with markers if that was deemed necessary. The boundary defined by the treaty is still the recognized border between Brazil and now-independent Suriname. There are no border checkpoints along the border, and much of the border region consists of impenetrable rainforest, but the boundary commission has set down 60 border markers along the Brazil–Suriname border.

The border described in the treaty was the result of a negotiation process between the Netherlands and Brazil and followed the establishment of the borders between Brazil and France (French Guiana, to the west) and Brazil and the United Kingdom (British Guiana, to the east. ) that were based on the same watershed. The latter borders were established after two arbitrations that were headed by Walter Hauser, President of the Swiss Confederation, and King of Italy Victor Emmanuel III, respectively. 

The treaty was signed in Rio de Janeiro on 5 May 1906. Brazil and the Netherlands both ratified the treaty in 1908.

See also
Borders of Suriname
Borders of Brazil

References
Surya P. Sharma (1997). Territorial Acquisition, Disputes and International Law. (M. Nijhoff Publishers: The Hague)

External links
Treaty of Limits: Full text (Portuguese)

Limits (Brazil-Netherlands)
Limits (Brazil-Netherlands)
Arbitration cases
Limits (Brazil-Netherlands)
Limits (Brazil-Netherlands)
Brazil–Suriname border
Limits (Brazil-Netherlands)
1906 in Brazil
1906 in the Netherlands
Limits (Brazil-Netherlands)
Brazil–Netherlands relations